Dichelonyx canadensis is a species of May beetle or junebug in the family Scarabaeidae. It is found in North America.

References

Further reading

External links

 

Melolonthinae
Beetles described in 1876